Harry Arthur Bisbey (May 10, 1931 – May 4, 1992) was an American water polo player who competed in the 1952 Summer Olympics. He was born in Santa Monica, California.  He graduated from El Segundo High School. Bisbey was a member of the American water polo team which finished fourth in the 1952 tournament. He played all nine matches as goalkeeper. In 1980, he was inducted into the USA Water Polo Hall of Fame.

See also
 List of men's Olympic water polo tournament goalkeepers

References

External links
 

1931 births
1992 deaths
Sportspeople from Santa Monica, California
American male water polo players
Water polo goalkeepers
Olympic water polo players of the United States
Water polo players at the 1952 Summer Olympics
El Segundo High School alumni